Prospect Park is a residential neighborhood in Pasadena, California. It is bordered by Westgate Street to the north, Orange Grove Boulevard to the south, Rosemont Avenue to the west, and Lincoln Avenue to the east. 

The original plan for the Prospect Park neighborhood was laid out in 1906, two years after J.C. Brainerd, Nyles Eaton, and John C. Bentz acquired the 32-acre parcel adjacent to a Los Angeles and Salt Lake Railroad spur.  The land was divided into 64 lots along wide curved streets planted with camphor and palm trees. The area was filled in with architecturally distinctive homes by master architects, including Greene and Greene, during the 1910s and 20s.

Education
Prospect Park is served by Cleveland Elementary School, Washington Middle School, and John Muir High School.

Transportation
Prospect Park is served by Metro Local line 256. It is also served by Pasadena Transit routes 51 and 52.

References
 

Neighborhoods in Pasadena, California